Carol Guess (born January 3, 1968) is an American poet and fiction writer. Her work emphasizes compression, musicality, and experimental structure.

Biography
Guess attended Columbia University, majoring in English while studying ballet. She later earned graduate degrees in Creative Writing and English from Indiana University. Currently Professor of English at Western Washington University, she lives in Seattle. Guess identifies as queer and was a member of the Lesbian Avengers in the 1990s. Her books Homeschooling, Femme's Dictionary, and Gaslight were nominated for Lambda Literary Awards. Switch was a finalist for the American Library Association's Stonewall Book Award in 1999. In 2014 she was awarded the Philolexian Award for Distinguished Literary Achievement by the Philolexian Society of Columbia University.

Selected publications
 Girl Zoo (co-written with Aimee Parkison), FC2, 2019.
 True Ash (co-written with Elizabeth J. Colen), Black Lawrence Press, August 2018. 
 Instructions for Staging (co-written with Kristina Marie Darling), Broadstone Books, 2017.
 Human-Ghost Hybrid Project (co-written with Daniela Olszewska), Black Lawrence Press, 2017.
 The Reckless Remainder (co-written with Kelly Magee), Noctuary Press, 2016.
 Your Sick (co-written with Elizabeth J. Colen and Kelly Magee), Jellyfish Highway Press, 2016.
 With Animal (co-written with Kelly Magee), Black Lawrence Press, 2015.
 How to Feel Confident with Your Special Talents (co-written with Daniela Olszewska), Black Lawrence Press, 2014.
  X Marks The Dress: A Registry (co-written with Kristina Marie Darling), Gold Wake Press, 2013.
  F IN (Noctuary Press, 2013)
  Index Of Placebo Effects (Matter Press, 2012)
  Doll Studies: Forensics (Black Lawrence Press, 2012)
 Darling Endangered (Brooklyn Arts Press, 2011)
  My Father In Water (Shearsman Books, 2011)
  Homeschooling (PS Publishing, 2010)
 Love Is A Map I Must Not Set On Fire (VRZHU Press, 2009)
 Tinderbox Lawn (Rose Metal Press, 2008)
 Femme's Dictionary (Calyx Books, 2004)
 Gaslight (Odd Girls Press, 2001)
 Switch (Calyx Books, 1998)
 Seeing Dell (Cleis Press, 1996)

References

External links
 Author's blog
Video of reading at wikiHow headquarters, July 2014
Review of Tinderbox Lawn
Review of Doll Studies: Forensics
Review of Doll Studies: Forensics
Review of Darling Endangered
Review of F IN
Review of X Marks The Dress: A Registry

1968 births
Living people
20th-century American novelists
21st-century American novelists
American women novelists
American women poets
American lesbian writers
Western Washington University faculty
American LGBT poets
American LGBT novelists
LGBT people from Maryland
LGBT people from Washington (state)
20th-century American women writers
21st-century American women writers
20th-century American poets
21st-century American poets
Novelists from Washington (state)
Columbia College (New York) alumni
Lesbian Avengers members
American women academics
21st-century American LGBT people